Shadow Country is a 2020 Czech historical drama film directed by Bohdan Sláma. It is inspired by  massacre from May 1945. It chronicles life of a small village from 1930s to 1950s. The film premiered at the 2020 Summer Film School Uherské Hradiště and is set to release to theatres on 10 September 2020. The film won six Czech Lion Awards including Best Actress, Best Supporting Actress, and Best Screenplay.

Cast
 Magdaléna Borová as Veberová
 Stanislav Majer as Veber
 Barbora Poláková as Marta Lišková 
 Csongor Kassai as Josef Pachl
 Petra Špalková
 Zuzana Kronerová
 Pavel Nový
 Cyril Drozda
 Marek Taclík

References

External links
 
 Shadow Country at CSFD.cz 

2020 films
Czech historical drama films
2020s Czech-language films
2020s historical drama films
Czech Lion Awards winners (films)
Czech World War II films